Ayşe Tezel (born 19 September 1980) is a British Turk actress who made her debut in two episodes of the New Zealand television show Shortland Street in April 2002. She has acted in a number of television series and feature films shot in New Zealand and Australia, where she may be best known for her roles in Meet Me in Miami (2005) and Court of Lonely Royals (2007). After a seven-year absence from film and television, she appeared in two episodes of Shortland Street in July 2021, as a different character from her 2002 appearance.

Biography
Tezel was born in London. She took her first ballet lesson when she was three years old and enrolled at repertory theatre when she was eight.

{ and landed leading roles in the feature films Gene-X and Court of Lonely Royals.

Voice acting

Filmography

Film

Television

References

External links
 
 

English people of Turkish descent
Turkish people of New Zealand descent
New Zealand people of Turkish descent
Turkish film actresses
Turkish television actresses
British film actresses
British television actresses
1980 births
Living people